Maitua Feterika (born 19 May 1992) is a New Zealand rugby league footballer.

She previously played for the Brisbane Broncos, St George Illawarra Dragons and Newcastle Knights in the NRL Women's Premiership.

Primarily a er, she has represented Samoa, New Zealand and Queensland.

Playing career
A Otahuhu Leopards junior, Feterika represented Samoa in their Test match against Australia in 2011.

In 2014, while playing for Counties Manukau, she was selected for New Zealand, starting on the wing in their 12–8 win over Australia at WIN Stadium.

2018
In 2018, Feterika moved to Australia, joining Ipswich Brothers in the QRL Women's Division 1 competition. In June, she represented South East Queensland at the Women's National Championships. On 22 June, Feterika represented Queensland under residency rules. 

On 28 June, she signed with the Brisbane Broncos NRL Women's Premiership team. In Round 1 of the 2018 NRL Women's season, Feterika made her debut in the Broncos' 30–4 win over the St George Illawarra Dragons, scoring a try.

2019
In April, revised eligibility laws were announced by the QRL, which ruled Feterika ineligible to represent Queensland. In May, she represented South East Queensland at the Women's National Championships. 

In June, Feterika joined St Marys RLFC in the NSWRL Women's Premiership. In July, she signed with the St George Illawarra Dragons. On 6 October, she started at prop in the Dragons' 6–30 Grand Final loss to the Broncos.

2020
In 2020, Feterika began the season playing fore St Marys before returning to New Zealand due to the COVID-19 pandemic, which saw her miss the 2020 NRL Women's season. On 7 November, she played her 10th Test for New Zealand in a 28–8 win over Samoa.

2021
On 1 December, Feterika signed with the Newcastle Knights to be a part of their inaugural NRLW squad.

2022
In round 2 of the delayed 2021 NRL Women's season, Feterika made her club debut for the Knights against the Brisbane Broncos. She played in 3 matches for the Knights, scoring one try, before parting ways with the club at the end of the season.

Achievements and accolades

Team
2018 NRLW Grand Final: Brisbane Broncos – Winners

References

External links
Newcastle Knights profile
NZRL profile

1992 births
Living people
Rugby league players from Auckland
New Zealand sportspeople of Samoan descent
New Zealand female rugby league players
New Zealand women's national rugby league team players
Samoa women's national rugby league team players
Rugby league second-rows
Rugby league centres
Rugby league props
Brisbane Broncos (NRLW) players
St. George Illawarra Dragons (NRLW) players
Newcastle Knights (NRLW) players